Luchando por el Metal ("Fighting for the Metal") is the first studio album by Argentine heavy metal band V8, released in March 1983.
At the time the album was released, the genre was very popular, and this album became second in popularity, only behind Riff.

The biggest hits of the albums were: "Destrucción", "Brigadas Metálicas" and "Hiena De Metal", the last song with Pappo's participation.

Luchando por el Metal is ranked at #53 in the Argentine version of Rolling Stone's "Los 100 Mejores Discos del Rock Nacional" (The 100 Greatest Records in Argentine Rock).

Track listing 
All song written by Ricardo Iorio, Osvaldo Civile, Alberto Zamarbide and Gustavo Rowek.

"Destrucción" – 2:00
"Parcas sangrientas" – 2:56
"Si puedes vencer al temor" – 5:53
"Ángeles de las tinieblas" – 2:30
"Tiempos metálicos" – 2:26
"Muy cansado estoy" – 3:20
"Brigadas metálicas" – 3:01
"Torturador" – 2:30
"Hiena de metal" – 1:38

Personnel 
V8
Ricardo Iorio – bass, backing vocals
Osvaldo Civile – lead guitar
Alberto Zamarbide – lead vocals
Gustavo Rowek – drums

Guests
Pappo – lead guitar and vocals on "Hiena De Metal"
Marcelo Vitale – keyboards on "Si Puedes Vencer al Temor"

References 

1983 albums
V8 (band) albums